Anthocoris is a genus of minute pirate bugs in the family Anthocoridae. There are at least 30 described species in Anthocoris.

Species 
These 32 species belong to the genus Anthocoris:

 Anthocoris albiger Reuter, 1884 i c g
 Anthocoris alienus (White, 1880) g
 Anthocoris amplicollis Horváth, 1893 g
 Anthocoris antevolens White, 1879 i c g b
 Anthocoris bakeri Poppius, 1913 i c g b
 Anthocoris bicuspis (Herrich-Schaeffer, 1835) i c g
 Anthocoris butleri Le Quesne, 1954 g
 Anthocoris caucasicus Kolenati, 1857 g
 Anthocoris confusus Reuter, 1884 i c g b
 Anthocoris dimorphicus Anderson & Kelton, 1963 i c g b
 Anthocoris fulvipennis Reuter, 1884 i c g
 Anthocoris gallarumulmi (De Geer, 1773) g
 Anthocoris guentheri Pericart, 2007 g
 Anthocoris limbatus Fieber, 1836 g
 Anthocoris minki Dohrn, 1860 g
 Anthocoris musculus (Say, 1832) i c g b
 Anthocoris nemoralis (Fabricius, 1794) i c g b (flower bug)
 Anthocoris nemorum (Linnaeus, 1761) i c g
 Anthocoris nigricornis Zetterstedt, 1838 g
 Anthocoris nigripes Reuter, 1884 i c g
 Anthocoris pilosus (Jakovlev, 1877) g
 Anthocoris pini Barensprung, 1858 g
 Anthocoris poissoni Kiritshenko, 1952 g
 Anthocoris salicis Lindberg, 1953 g
 Anthocoris sarothamni Douglas & Scott, 1865 g
 Anthocoris simillimus Poppius, 1909 g
 Anthocoris simulans Reuter, 1884 g
 Anthocoris stigmatellus Zetterstedt, 1838 g
 Anthocoris tomentosus Péricart, 1971 i c g b
 Anthocoris tristis Van Duzee, 1921 i c g
 Anthocoris visci Douglas, 1889 g
 Anthocoris whitei Reuter, 1884 i c g b

Data sources: i = ITIS, c = Catalogue of Life, g = GBIF, b = Bugguide.net

References

Cimicomorpha genera
Anthocorini